Bandolier is the fifth album by Welsh rock band Budgie, released in September 1975 through MCA Records. It reached #36 in the UK. The album was released in the US on A&M Records in late 1975. The cover art was created by artist Patrick Woodroffe. This was the first LP to feature drummer Steve Williams, who thereafter would play on all of Budgie's releases, along with Burke Shelley.

The song "I Can't See My Feelings" was covered by Iron Maiden on the B-side of their 1992 single "From Here to Eternity".

'Bandolier – Budgie', a free iTunes app for iPad, iPhone and iPod touch, was released in December 2011. It tells the story of the making of Bandolier in the band's own words, including an extensive audio interview with Burke Shelley.

Track listing

Personnel
Budgie
Burke Shelley – bass guitar, vocals
Tony Bourge – guitar, vocals, harmonica
Steve Williams – drums
Production
Budgie – producer
Richard Manwaring – engineer
Pat Moran – engineer
Ray Martinez – engineer
John Pasche – art direction
Pete Vernon – photography
Patrick Woodroffe – cover illustration

Charts
Album

References

1975 albums
MCA Records albums
Budgie (band) albums
Albums recorded at Rockfield Studios